WOG (West Oil Group) is a gas stations chain in Ukraine consisting of more than 400 Filling stations.

History 
In 2000, the first gas station complex under the WOG brand was opened in the village of Tsuman in Volyn.

Filling stations were opened in Kyiv and Odesa (2006), Chernihiv, Zaporizhia, Poltava, Kherson, Luhansk, and Kharkiv regions (2007), Donetsk region (2009), Dnipro (2019).

In 2002, WOG had more than 200 filling stations.

In 2007, the first Sun Market stores appeared at WOG filling stations. 

In 2008, WOG started cooperation with the international company Deloitte.

In 2009, WOG launched 100 MUSTANG fuel.

In 2010, the loyalty program for PRIDE regular customers started. The company won a number of tenders for the supply of fuel for large state and international enterprises, including SJSC "Motor Roads of Ukraine", "Ukrposhta", mining and processing plant "MetInvest", "ArcelorMittal", "Energoatom", "Ukrzaliznytsia".

In 2011, the chain had more than 400 filling stations in Ukraine.

In 2013, WOG started sales of diesel fuel of the new generation MUSTANG +.

In 2014, the project "The coffeest coffee" was launched.

The same year WOG held a presentation of a branded gas LPG MUSTANG. 

In 2015, WOG Cafe in Kyiv was opened, which operates outside filling stations.

In 2017, the company launched the WOG Pay service, which allows to refuel a car without leaving it; WOG Cafe was opened at Kyiv Airport (Zhulyany). 

In 2019, WOG Cafe was opened at the airports of Lviv and Odesa. At the end of the year, there were more than 150 electric chargers in the network, including 37 supercharges.

Chain 
Filling stations are represented in 24 regions of Ukraine. As of 2020, the number of employees is 7,000.

Structure 
WOG includes 20 oil depots and more than 400 filling stations in Ukraine, 368 WOG Cafe, 245 WOG Market. WOG Cafe is also available at 4 airports in Ukraine (Kyiv (Boryspil, Zhulyany), Odesa, Lviv) and on Intercity and Intercity + Ukrzaliznytsia trains.

Management 
WOG belongs to the Continuum fuel and industrial group, which was owned by the main shareholder of WOG Igor Yeremeyev.

After his death in 2015, his children became shareholders of the company together with Stepan Ivakhiv and Sergii Lagur.

In 2018, Mykhailo Romaniv was appointed CEO.

Pavlo Shybaiev is the Head of stores management department WOG.

Production 
In autumn 2010, the company began supplying diesel fuel under the Mustang brand. This fuel is imported from refineries in Romania, Greece, Lithuania, Poland, and Belarus.

Awards 
2009 — WOG brand is recognized as the most expensive among national brands in the field of "Fuel and Energy" ($ 26.9 million).

2010 — the WOG brand was recognized as the most expensive among national brands in the field of "Fuel and Energy" ($ 33.2 million) according to MPP Consulting.

2010-2014 — winner of the nomination "Chain of gas stations of the year" according to the version of "Choice of the Year" in Ukraine.

2015 — WOG Cafe won the award in the nomination "Innovation of the Year" business award "Private Label 2015".

2016 — the highest capital index of the brand (3.11 - high) according to the marketing research of the international company Nielsen.

2018 — 30 position in the rating "TOP-100 most expensive brands of Ukraine" according to MPP Consulting.

2020 — victory in the nomination "Most Recognizable VTM of the Year" of the National Business Award "Private Label 2020".

Other activities 
The company is implementing the charity project "Road of Good" (Ukrainian: Дорога добра) to help purchase and repair of equipment in medical institutions.

In 2020, during the Covid-19 pandemic, the company participated in a joint program with the taxi service Uklon #TaxiForDonor and, with the assistance of the DonorUA and #WorthLife foundations, provided 20,000 donor trips to blood centers.

The same year WOG started providing 6-8 square meters at gas stations for the stands of small and medium-sized businesses within the project "Opening new opportunities for small and medium-sized businesses".

In 2021, the company supported the "Batteries, give up" (Ukrainian: Батарейки, здавайтесь) initiative to collect and recycle used batteries.

References

External links
 WOG — official website
Interview with Vladlena Rusina 
Zakhar Klyakhin 
Yulia Pishachenko 
Photo of the station in Kyiv Oblast. Panoramio. / Flickr.
 Station futuristic design. Igloo architecture.
 Locations of WOG gas stations by GeoDeg.

Convenience stores of Ukraine
Filling stations in Ukraine
Companies based in Lutsk
Energy companies established in 2000
Non-renewable resource companies established in 2000
Retail companies established in 2000
Ukrainian companies established in 2000
Privately held companies based in Volyn Oblast
Privately held companies in Ukraine